Sandra Faye "Sandi" Patty (born July 12, 1956) is an American Christian music singer, known for her wide soprano vocal range and expressive flexibility.

Biography

Early life
Patty was born in Oklahoma City, Oklahoma, into a family of musicians; her father was a minister of music, and her mother served as the church pianist. She first performed at the age of two when she sang "Jesus Loves Me" for her church, Phoenix First Church of God. First growing up in Phoenix, then San Diego, she and her brothers joined their parents in a performing group known as "The Ron Patty Family", and sang at churches nationwide during summer holidays. After graduating from Crawford High School in San Diego, she attended San Diego State University and Anderson University in Anderson, Indiana, where she studied voice with soprano Greta Dominic, but graduated with an emphasis in conducting. While studying at Anderson University, she worked as a studio musician for area recording studios, singing background vocals and recording commercial jingles, including one for Juicy Fruit gum. Her reputation as a performer and studio singer grew during the late 1970s, and it was during this time that she initiated contact with legendary Christian musician Bill Gaither.

Singing career
Patty recorded her first album, For My Friends, an independent effort, that landed in the hands of executives at Singspiration! records. In 1979, she was signed to Singspiration! and released her first professional record, Sandi's Song. According to the FAQ section on her website, the name on her birth certificate is Sandra Patty. A printer's error on the labeling listed her name as Sandi Patti, and she used this moniker as her stage name for the next fifteen years, before correcting it to Sandi Patty.

Patty's career expanded after she won her first two GMA Dove Awards in 1982 and began singing backup for Bill Gaither and the Bill Gaither Trio. She headlined her first national tour in 1984 and reached national acclaim after her rendition of "The Star-Spangled Banner" was included during the ABC Statue of Liberty re-dedication broadcast on July 6, 1986. This exposure led to multiple mainstream television appearances including The Tonight Show, Christmas in Washington, Walt Disney's Fourth of July Extravaganza, and the 1998 Pepsi 400; the clip was frequently used on television sign-offs for the remainder of their existence. She was invited to sing the national anthem at the Indianapolis 500 in 1987–88, 1990–92, and once again in 2013.

In 1990, Patty's inspirational single release, "I'll Give You Peace", written by Constant Change aka Dawn Thomas and Thomas Yarbrough, was released on one of her most popular records, entitled, Another Time...Another Place, which peaked at #2 on the Billboard Christian Albums charts. At the peak of her career, Patty's concerts were so heavily attended that she performed in often sold-out mainstream arenas and concert halls across the United States. In the late 1980s and early 1990s, she averaged over 200 concerts a year and supported a staff of over 30 that managed her career. During this period of time Patty was noted, often critically, as the highest-paid singer in the Christian music industry averaging over $100,000 per appearance, largely due to massive touring and high-profile public appearances.

Divorce
In 1992, the news of Patty's divorce from manager John Helvering shocked the gospel music industry. The reason for the split was later revealed to be infidelity, which subsequently stalled her career in the mid 1990s. It was later reported that during her marriage she had an extramarital affair with her backup singer, Don Peslis, who was also married at the time. Patty divorced Helvering in 1993 and married Peslis in August 1995. Confronted with rumors of the affair just two weeks into her marriage with Peslis, Patty made a full confession to her church congregation. During this time, Patty received support from national figure, Charles Schulz, the creator of the Peanuts comic strip. He referenced her in a comic strip, and Patty is quoted in a recent spiritual biography of Schulz as having been touched by the gesture.

Comeback
Patty slowly rebuilt her career by expanding her musical appeal, which included pop concert performances with symphony orchestras including the New York Symphony Orchestra, Boston Symphony Orchestra, Prague Symphony Orchestra, London Symphony Orchestra, Atlanta Symphony Orchestra, the Cincinnati Pops, and the Dallas Symphony as well as headlining and hosting the Yuletide Celebration with the Indianapolis Symphony Orchestra in 2000, 2002, 2005, 2007, 2010, 2013, and 2015 under the direction of Maestro Jack Everly. Patty again hosted the extravaganza in December 2017 and 2021.

In both interviews and in her autobiography, Broken on the Back Row, Patty expressed remorse and took full responsibility for her past actions, revealing the steps she took in seeking forgiveness from those that her actions most affected.

In 2000, Patty had a guest singing appearance at the end of a 7th Heaven episode (season 4, episode 20). She appeared in the 2006 annual Macy's Thanksgiving Day Parade in New York. A televised performance of Sandi Patty's Yuletide Special was filmed for syndication in 2006, with other performers—including the Mormon Tabernacle Choir and the U.S. Air Force Reserve Band.

In 2004, Patty was inducted into the Gospel Music Hall of Fame and in 2007 was awarded the GMA Music in the Rockies Summit Award.

In May 2008, Patty released her 30th studio recording, Songs for the Journey, in which she covers classic hymns of the church and other modern gospel classics. 2008 also saw the release of five separate compilation recordings of past songs taken from previous albums. In 2009, Patty received two GMA Dove Award nominations: Female Vocalist of the Year, and Inspirational Album of the Year (Songs for the Journey).

Simply Sandi, an acoustic album, is the first solo project to be released on her own record label, Stylos Records (a label with three artists—Sandi, Ben Utecht, and Heather Payne). It was released on May 5, 2009. This album includes new renditions of some of Sandi's most beloved songs including "In Heaven's Eyes", "Via Dolorosa" and "The Stage is Bare". WEA Distribution is the distributor for Stylos Records, although this album is not being released commercially.

In Fall 2009, Patty released her first live Christmas album entitled Christmas: LIVE. The album includes live performances of her past Christmas favorites including "O Holy Night", "Someday", and a duet with her husband Don Peslis in "The Prayer".

2010–present
In late 2010, Patty released The Edge of the Divine. The album featured eight new songs, including a duet with Heather Payne. A book of the same name was also released with the sub-title "Where Possibility Meets God's Faithfulness."

In October 2011, Patty released Broadway Stories, which capitalized on Patty's pops concerts popularity. From iTunes Review: "Before Sandi Patty was a Christian music star, she developed her craft by performing stage standards and pop tunes from the Great American Songbook. Broadway Stories reaffirms her mastery of such material against gorgeous backdrops provided by the 64-piece Prague Symphony Orchestra. From the first track to the last, Patty shows an easy command of the Broadway idiom, applying her formidable pipes to material worthy of her talents."

In January 2012, Patty starred as Dolly Levi in the Indianapolis Symphony Orchestra's world premiere concert stage version of the Broadway musical, "Hello, Dolly!" to rave reviews.

In 2012 and 2013, Patty was a judge and mentor for the Songbook Academy, a summer intensive for high school students operated by the Great American Songbook Foundation and founded by Michael Feinstein.

In 2015, Patty announced her retirement from touring, citing age and a desire to spend time with grandchildren.

In 2016, Patty released Forever Grateful, an album of new and re-recorded material, and embarked on a farewell tour of the same title between February 2016 through March 2017. She is currently the Artist in Residence at Crossings Community Church in Oklahoma City, Oklahoma.

In 2020, Patty announced she had tested positive for coronavirus (COVID-19). She released a video urging her fans to take the disease seriously and practice social distancing, handwashing, etc., adding, "This is NOT fake news!"

Personal life
In 2009, Patty and her family relocated from Anderson, Indiana, to Oklahoma City, Oklahoma. She is married to Don Peslis.  As a blended family, they have eight children and eight grandchildren.

Patty has supported charities such as Charity Music Inc.

Discography

1972 (approx.): The Ron Patty Family - From Our House to Yours (Anodyne SW1043, San Diego, California)
1978: Sandi Patty – For My Friends (Burlap Sound Inc., Anderson, Indiana)
1979: Sandi's Song
1981: Love Overflowing
1982: Lift Up the Lord
1983: More Than Wonderful
1983: Christmas: The Gift Goes On
1984: Songs from the Heart
1985: Hymns Just for You
1986: Morning Like This
1988: Make His Praise Glorious
1989: Sandi Patti and the Friendship Company
1990: Another Time...Another Place
1991: The Friendship Company: Open for Business
1993: Le Voyage
1994: Find It On the Wings (released under Sandi Patty)
1996: O Holy Night! (Christmas)
1996: An American Songbook (non-commercial release)
1997: Artist of My Soul
1998: Libertad me das (Spanish album)
1999: Together (with Kathy Troccoli)
2000: These Days
2001: All the Best...Live! (Released in conjunction with VHS Video)
2003: Take Hold of Christ
2004: Hymns of Faith...Songs of Inspiration
2005: Yuletide Joy (Christmas)
2007: Falling forward
2008: Songs for The Journey
2008: A Mother's Prayer
2009: Simply Sandi
2009: Christmas Live (Christmas) (Released in conjunction with DVD Video)
2010: The Edge of the Divine
2011: Broadway Stories
2013: Everlasting (Target store exclusive)
2014: Christmas Blessings
2015: Sweet Dreams: Soothing Lullabies (Wal-Mart exclusive)
2016: Forever Grateful (Lifeway exclusive)
2017:  Forever Grateful: Live From the Farewell Tour (Released in conjunction with DVD Video)

Compilations

1985: Inspirational Favorites
1989: The Finest Moments (contains one new song)
1992: Hallmark Christmas: Celebrate Christmas!
1994: Quiet Reflections
1996: Hallmark Christmas: It's Christmas! Sandi Patty & Peabo Bryson
2005: Duets
2006: The Voice of Christmas
2007: The Definitive Collection
2008: Gospel Greats
2008: Via Dolorosa: Songs of Redemption
2008: A Mother's Prayer: Songs that Inspire a Mother's Heart
2008: Quiet Hearts: Songs of Restful Peace for Women
2008: Let There Be Praise
2009: Duets 2
2011: The Best of Sandi Patty from the Gaither Homecoming Series
2012: The Voice of Christmas, Volume 2
2012: Rarities
2014: Ultimate Collection, Volume 1
2014: Ultimate Collection, Volume 2

Writing
1993: Le Voyage
1994: Merry Christmas, With Love
1999: Sam's Rainbow
2000: I've Just Seen Jesus
2006: Broken on the Back Row
2006: Life in the Blender: Blending Families, Lives and Relationships with Grace (Women of Faith)
2006: A New Day: A Guided Journal
2007: Falling Forward... into His Arms of Grace
2008: Layers
2010: The Edge of the Divine
2018: "The Voice: Listening for God's Voice and Finding Your Own"

Awards and nominations

Grammy Awards

GMA Dove Awards
1982–92: Female Vocalist of the Year (11 consecutive years)
1982, 1984, 1985, 1987, 1988: Artist of the Year
Inducted into the  Gospel Music Association Hall of Fame in 2004

References

External links

Profile by the University of Mobile
William Morris Agency profile; includes touring schedule
Biography at mp3.com
Sandi Patty Music Albums
Sandi Patty Music Interviews & Album Info

1956 births
Living people
20th-century American singers
20th-century Christians
20th-century American women singers
21st-century American singers
21st-century Christians
21st-century American women singers
American performers of Christian music
American sopranos
Anderson University (Indiana) alumni
Christians from Indiana
Christians from Oklahoma
Grammy Award winners
Members of the Church of God (Anderson, Indiana)
Musicians from Anderson, Indiana
Musicians from Oklahoma City
San Diego State University alumni
Southern gospel performers